Gutheil is a German surname of:

 Emil Arthur Gutheil (1889–1959), Polish-American psychiatrist
  (1868–1914), German conductor and composer, husband of Marie Gutheil-Schoder
 Marie Gutheil-Schoder (1874–1935), German soprano
  (born 1959), German jurist

See also
Gutheil (publisher), founded in 1859 by Alexander Bogdanovich Gutheil, later an imprint of Serge Koussevitzky's Editions Russes

German-language surnames